Dame Froyla Tzalam, is a Belizean Mopan Maya anthropologist and community leader, who has served as the Governor-General of Belize since 27 May 2021.

She is the first indigenous person of Maya descent to serve as governor-general of any country in the history of the Commonwealth.

Education

Tzalam is from the village of San Antonio, Toledo. She graduated with a BA in Anthropology from Trinity University, Texas. This was followed by a MA in Rural Development from University of Sussex.

Career

She was the executive director of the Sarstoon Temash Institute for Indigenous Management (SATIIM).

Tzalam was shortlisted for nomination to the Senate in January 2017, but declined in order to concentrate on her work with SATIIM.

Governor-General of Belize

It was announced on 22 April 2021 by Prime Minister of Belize John Briceno that she was nominated to be the next Governor-General of Belize following the retirement of Colville Young. She is the third Governor-General and the second woman appointed to the role.

On 21 March 2022, she was invested as a Dame Grand Cross of the Order of St Michael and St George by HRH The Prince of Wales during their Royal Tour.

References

Year of birth missing (living people)
Living people
Governors-General of Belize
Dames Grand Cross of the Order of St Michael and St George
Anthropologists
Belizean women in politics
Belizean women
Indigenous peoples in Belize
Belizean Maya people
Indigenous activists of the Americas
People from Toledo District
Trinity University (Texas) alumni
Alumni of the University of Sussex